Ruth Alston Brown (January 12, 1928 – November 17, 2006) was an American singer-songwriter and actress, sometimes referred to as the "Queen of R&B". She was noted for bringing a pop music style to R&B music in a series of hit songs for Atlantic Records in the 1950s, such as "So Long", "Teardrops from My Eyes" and "(Mama) He Treats Your Daughter Mean". For these contributions, Atlantic became known as "the house that Ruth built" (alluding to the popular nickname for the old Yankee Stadium). Brown was a 1993 inductee into the Rock and Roll Hall of Fame.

Following a resurgence that began in the mid-1970s and peaked in the 1980s, Brown used her influence to press for musicians' rights regarding royalties and contracts; these efforts led to the founding of the Rhythm and Blues Foundation. Her performances in the Broadway musical Black and Blue earned Brown a Tony Award, and the original cast recording won a Grammy Award. Brown was a recipient of the Grammy Lifetime Achievement Award in 2016. In 2017, Brown was inducted into National Rhythm & Blues Hall of Fame. She is also the aunt to legendary hip hop MC Rakim.

Early life
Born in Portsmouth, Virginia, Brown was the eldest of seven siblings. She attended I. C. Norcom High School. Brown's father was a dockhand. He also directed the local church choir at Emmanuel African Methodist Episcopal Church, but the young Ruth showed more interest in singing at USO shows and nightclubs, rebelling against her father. She was inspired by Sarah Vaughan, Billie Holiday, and Dinah Washington.

In 1945, aged 17, Brown ran away from her home in Portsmouth along with the trumpeter Jimmy Brown, whom she soon married, to sing in bars and clubs. She then spent a month with Lucky Millinder's orchestra.

Early career

Blanche Calloway, Cab Calloway's sister, also a bandleader, arranged a gig for Brown at the Crystal Caverns, a nightclub in Washington, D.C., and soon became her manager. Willis Conover, the future Voice of America disc jockey, caught her act with Duke Ellington and recommended her to Atlantic Records bosses Ahmet Ertegun and Herb Abramson. Brown was unable to audition as planned because of a car crash, which resulted in a nine-month stay in the hospital. She signed with Atlantic Records from her hospital bed.

In 1948, Ertegun and Abramson drove from New York City to Washington, D.C., to hear Brown sing. Her repertoire was mostly popular ballads, but Ertegun convinced her to switch to rhythm and blues.

In her first audition, in 1949, she sang "So Long," which became a hit. This was followed by "Teardrops from My Eyes" in 1950. Written by Rudy Toombs, it was the first upbeat major hit for Brown. Recorded for Atlantic Records in New York City in September 1950 and released in October, it was Billboards R&B number one for 11 weeks. The hit earned her the nickname "Miss Rhythm", and within a few months, she became the acknowledged queen of R&B.

She followed up this hit with "I'll Wait for You" (1951), "I Know" (1951), "5-10-15 Hours" (1953), "(Mama) He Treats Your Daughter Mean" (1953), "Oh What a Dream" (1954), "Mambo Baby" (1954), and "Don't Deceive Me" (1960), some of which were credited to Ruth Brown and the Rhythm Makers. Between 1949 and 1955, her records stayed on the R&B chart for a total of 149 weeks; she would go on to score 21 Top 10 hits all together, including five that landed at number one. Brown ranked No. 1 on The Billboard 1954 Disk Jockey Poll for Favorite R&B Artists.

Brown played many racially segregated dances in the southern states, where she toured extensively and was immensely popular. She claimed that a writer had once summed up her popularity by saying, "In the South, Ruth Brown is better known than Coca-Cola."

Brown performed at the famed tenth Cavalcade of Jazz concert held at Wrigley Field in Los Angeles, which was produced by Leon Hefflin, Sr. on June 20, 1954. She performed along with The Flairs, Count Basie and his Orchestra, Lamp Lighters, Louis Jordan and His Tympany Five, Christine Kittrell, and Perez Prado and his Orchestra.

Her first pop hit came with "Lucky Lips", a song written by Jerry Leiber and Mike Stoller and recorded in 1957. The single reached number 6 on the R&B chart and number 25 on the U.S. pop chart. The 1958 follow-up was "This Little Girl's Gone Rockin'", written by Bobby Darin and Mann Curtis. It reached number 7 on the R&B chart and number 24 on the pop chart.

She had further hits with "I Don't Know" in 1959 and "Don't Deceive Me" in 1960, which were more successful on the R&B chart than on the pop chart. In 1965 she appeared as a guest on TV Gospel Time. During the 1960s, Brown faded from public view and lived as a housewife and mother.

Later career

She returned to music in 1975 at the urging of the comedian Redd Foxx, followed by a series of comedic acting jobs. This launched her career in TV, film, and stage. She had a recurring role during the second season of the sitcom Hello, Larry as the neighbor, Leona Wilson. She starred as Motormouth Maybelle Stubbs, a friendly and strong-willed record promoter and mother of Seaweed and L'il Inez, in the John Waters cult classic film Hairspray. On Broadway, she starred in productions of Amen Corner and Black and Blue. The latter earned her a Tony Award for Best Actress in a Musical in 1989. The New York Times theater critic Frank Rich wrote, "Ruth Brown, the rhythm-and-blues chanteuse, applies sarcastic varnish and two-a-day burlesque timing to the ribald Andy Razaf lyrics of 'If I Can't Sell It, I'll Keep Sittin' on It.'"

Brown's fight for musicians' rights and royalties in 1987 led to the founding of the Rhythm and Blues Foundation in 1988. She was one of the first recipients of the Pioneer Award in 1989. In 1989, she released an album, "Blues and Broadway," which won a Grammy for best jazz vocal performance, female. She was inducted into the Oklahoma Jazz Hall of Fame in 1992 and the Rock and Roll Hall of Fame in 1993.

Brown recorded and sang with the rhythm-and-blues singer Charles Brown. She also toured with Bonnie Raitt in the late 1990s. Her 1995 autobiography, Miss Rhythm, won the Gleason Award for music journalism. She also appeared on Bonnie Raitt's 1995 live DVD Road Tested, singing "Never Make Your Move Too Soon". She was nominated for another Grammy in the Traditional Blues category for her 1997 album, R + B = Ruth Brown. In the 2000 television miniseries Little Richard, she was portrayed by singer Tressa Thomas.

She hosted the radio program Blues Stage, carried by more than 200 NPR affiliates, for six years, starting in 1989.

Brown was still touring at the age of 78. She had completed preproduction work on the Danny Glover film, Honeydripper, which she did not live to finish. Still, her recording of "Things About Comin' My Way" was released posthumously on the soundtrack CD. Her last interview was in August 2006.

Death
Brown died in a Las Vegas–area hospital on November 17, 2006, from complications following a heart attack and stroke she suffered after surgery in the previous month. She was 78 years old. A memorial concert for her was held on January 22, 2007, at the Abyssinian Baptist Church in Harlem, New York.

Brown is buried at Roosevelt Memorial Park, Chesapeake City, Virginia.

 Accolades 

She also received the following honors:

 1989: Rhythm & Blues Foundation Pioneer Award
 1992: Inducted into the Oklahoma Jazz Hall of Fame
 1993: Inducted into the Rock & Roll Hall of Fame
 1996: Ralph Gleason Award for Music Journalism
 2013: Inducted into the Virginia Musical Museum's Virginia Music Hall of Fame
 2016: Grammy Lifetime Achievement Award
 2017: Inducted into National Rhythm & Blues Hall of Fame

Discography
Studio albums
 Rock & Roll (Atlantic, 1957)
 Miss Rhythm (Atlantic, 1959)
 Late Date with Ruth Brown (Atlantic, 1959)
 Along Comes Ruth (Philips, 1962)
 Gospel Time (Philips, 1962)
 Ruth Brown '65 (Mainstream, 1965)
 Black Is Brown and Brown Is Beautiful (Skye, 1969)
 The Real Ruth Brown (Cobblestone/Buddah, 1972)
 Sugar Babe (President, 1976), re-issued in 1985 as Brown Sugar
 You Don't Know Me (Dobre, 1978)
 Blues on Broadway (Fantasy, 1989)
 Help a Good Girl Go Bad (MMS Classix, 1989)
 Brown, Black & Beautiful (SDEG/Ichiban, 1990)
 Fine and Mellow (Fantasy, 1991)
 The Songs of My Life (Fantasy, 1993)
 R + B = Ruth Brown (Bullseye Blues, 1997)
 A Good Day for the Blues (Bullseye Blues, 1999)

Live albums
 The Soul Survives (Flair, 1982)
 Takin' Care of Business (Stockholm, 1983)
 Have a Good Time (Fantasy, 1988)
 Live in London (Jazz House, 1995)

Compilations
 The Best of Ruth Brown (Atlantic, 1962) 
 Miss Rhythm (Greatest Hits And More) (Atlantic, 1989) 

As guestWith Thad Jones and Mel Lewis 
The Big Band Sound of Thad Jones/Mel Lewis Featuring Miss Ruth Brown (Solid State, 1968)With Benny Carter'''Benny Carter Songbook (MusicMasters, 1996)Benny Carter Songbook Volume II'' (MusicMasters, 1997)

Singles

References

External links
 
 
 
 

 Ruth Brown  at VH1
 Atlantic Records at Jazz Discography
 
 
 In Black America; Blues Superstar with Ruth Brown 1998-10-01. KUT Radio, American Archive of Public Broadcasting (WGBH and the Library of Congress)

1928 births
2006 deaths
African-American actresses
20th-century African-American women singers
American blues singer-songwriters
American rhythm and blues singers
Tony Award winners
Singer-songwriters from Virginia
Musicians from Portsmouth, Virginia
Atlantic Records artists
Cobblestone Records artists
Skye Records artists
Jump blues musicians
Actresses from Virginia
20th-century American actresses
20th-century American singers
Grammy Lifetime Achievement Award winners
20th-century American women singers
African-American songwriters
21st-century African-American people
21st-century African-American women